Albert Marcet Torrens (born 11 April 1960) is a Spanish economist, specialized in macroeconomics, time series, financial economics and economic dynamic theory. He is currently serving as Professor of Macroeconomics at the UCL Department of Economics, on leave from his position as ICREA Research Professor and Director of the Institute for Economic Analysis (IAE), a research centre of the Spanish National Research Council (CSIC), and AXA Research Chair on Macroeconomic Risk at the Barcelona Graduate School of Economics. He is also a Fellow of the Econometric Society and he has been a Research Fellow of Centre for Economic Policy Research (CEPR) since 1992.

Career
He holds a degree in Economics from Universitat Autònoma de Barcelona and a PhD in Economics from University of Minnesota.

He was a professor of Economics at the London School of Economics and Universitat Pompeu Fabra (UPF).

He has also served as President of the Spanish Economic Association (2007). In 2013, he received an Advanced Grant from the European Research Council (ERC) for his project, Asset Prices and Macro Policy when Agents Learn. Professor Marcet was the first Director of the Barcelona GSE Master in Macroeconomic Policy and Financial Markets. He now serves as its Scientific Director and teaches master courses in the program.

He has worked extensively in the field of agents' expectations modeling, working with Thomas Sargent and Juan Pablo Nicolini.

Awards
 in Economy, 2016.
Wim Duisenberg Fellowship, European Central Bank, 2006.

References

External links
 Homepage at Institute for Economic Analysis (IAE)
 CV

1960s births
Living people
21st-century  Spanish  economists
20th-century  Spanish economists
Autonomous University of Barcelona alumni
Academics of the London School of Economics
Academics of University College London
Academic staff of the Barcelona Graduate School of Economics
University of Minnesota College of Liberal Arts alumni
Fellows of the Econometric Society